Imelda Mary Read (born 8 January 1939), known as Mel Read, is a British politician who served in the European Parliament.

Read was educated at Bishopshalt Grammar School and the University of Nottingham, before becoming a laboratory technician, then an employment officer, and a lecturer.  At the 1979 general election, she stood unsuccessfully for the Labour Party in Melton, and at the 1983 general election, she was unsuccessful in North West Leicestershire.

Read became an MEP in 1989, representing first Leicester and then Nottingham and Leicestershire North West until 1999.  She served as a quaestor for part of this period. From 1999, she represented the enlarged seat of the East Midlands.

She stood down at the 2004 European election, at which time she was elected as President of the European Cervical Cancer Association. Read then resigned from the role in 2008

References

1939 births
Living people
Alumni of the University of Nottingham
Labour Party (UK) MEPs
Labour Party (UK) parliamentary candidates
MEPs for England 1989–1994
MEPs for England 1994–1999
MEPs for England 1999–2004
20th-century women MEPs for England
21st-century women MEPs for England